Bohemia – Remixes & Exclusives is a remix album consisting of the original tracks from the previous Ils release Bohemia, with remixes and exclusives, as the title suggests. It was released by Distinct'ive Records in July 2007.

Track listing
 "Intro" Reprise 2:09
 "Tiny Toy" 5:41
 "Angels" 5:25
 "Cherish" 4:43
 "Feed the Addiction" 4:38
 "Ill-Logic" 5:51
 "Storm from the East" 5:59
 "Precious" 3:32
 "Razorblade" 4:16
 "The World Is Yours" 3:42
 "Loving You" 4:13
 "West Coast" 5:16
 "Over My Head" 4:57
 "Cherish" Adam Freeland Mix 6:58
 "Cherish" Vicious Circle Mix 5:49
 "Cherish" Instrumental Mix 5:27
 "Loving You" Atomic Hooligan Mix 6:09
 "Storm From The East" ILS 12" Club Mix 5:52
 "Loving You" Drum Monkeys Remix 6:37
 "Razorblade" Stranger Remix 6:51
 "Angels" ILS 12" Version 5:27
 "Angels" Santos Another Planet Mix 8:31
 "Angels" Santos Come With Mix 8:05
 "Angels" ED 209 Mix 7:10
 "Angels" Teddy Tinkleman Mix 6:24
 "Baba O' Reilly" ILS Club Mix 6:04
 "Saxtrax" ILS Club Mix 6:01
 "Feed The Addiction" Deekline Mix 6:14
 "Feed The Addiction" Future Funk Squad Mix 7:56
 "Feed The Addiction" ILS Progressive Mix 5:48
 "Storm From The East" ILS Progressive Mix 5:34
 "World Is Yours" ILS Progressive Mix 5:47
 "Tiny Toy" ILS Progressive Mix 5:51
 "Storm From The East" Mystery Mix 6:39
 "Angels" Instrumental 5:32

References

Ils (producer) albums
2007 remix albums
Distinct'ive Records albums